Conostylis aculeata, commonly known as prickly conostylis, is a flowering, tufted perennial plant in the family Haemodoraceae. It has flat leaves and yellow, hairy, tubular flowers. It is endemic to the south-west of Western Australia.

Description
Flowering occurs from August to November.

Taxonomy and naming
Conostylis aculeata was first formally described in 1810 by botanist Robert Brown and the description was published in Prodromus Florae Novae Hollandiae.The specific epithet (aculeata) is in reference to the prickly leaves.

Distribution and habitat
This conostylis is a widespread species from the Zuytdorp National Park to Augusta and Albany and stretching inland to Cowcowing and Narembeen. It grows in various situations including sand, heath, loam and woodlands. Inland populations prefer wetter sites.

A number of subspecies are described and the names are accepted by the Australian Plant Census

C. aculeata R.Br. subsp. aculeata  
C. aculeata subsp. bracteata (Lindl.) J.W.Green
C. aculeata subsp. breviflora Hopper
C. aculeata subsp. bromelioides (Endl.) J.W.Green
C. aculeata subsp. cygnorum Hopper 
C. aculeata subsp. echinissima Hopper 
C. aculeata subsp. gracilis Hopper 
C. aculeata subsp. preissii (Endl.) J.W.Green 
C. aculeata subsp. rhipidion J.W.Green 
C. aculeata subsp. septentrionora Hopper 
C. aculeata subsp. spinuligera (Benth.) Hopper - Spiny Conostylis

References

aculeata
Commelinales of Australia
Angiosperms of Western Australia
Plants described in 1810
Taxa named by Robert Brown (botanist, born 1773)